There are 122 municipalities in the canton of Valais, Switzerland.

List 

Agarn
Albinen
Anniviers
Arbaz
Ardon
Ausserberg
Ayent
Baltschieder
Bellwald
Bettmeralp
Binn
Bister
Bitsch
Blatten
Bourg-Saint-Pierre
Bovernier
Brig-Glis
Bürchen
Chalais
Chamoson
Champéry
Chippis
Collombey-Muraz
Collonges
Conthey
Crans-Montana
Dorénaz
Eggerberg
Eischoll
Eisten
Embd
Ergisch
Ernen
Evionnaz
Evolène
Ferden
Fiesch
Fieschertal
Finhaut
Fully
Gampel-Bratsch
Goms
Grächen
Grengiols
Grimisuat
Grône
Guttet-Feschel
Hérémence
Icogne
Inden
Isérables
Kippel
Lalden
Lax
Lens
Leuk
Leukerbad
Leytron
Liddes
Martigny
Martigny-Combe
Massongex
Mont-Noble
Monthey
Mörel-Filet
Naters
Nendaz
Niedergesteln
Oberems
Obergoms
Orsières
Port-Valais
Randa
Raron
Riddes
Ried-Brig
Riederalp
Saas-Almagell
Saas-Balen
Saas-Fee
Saas-Grund
Saillon
Saint-Gingolph
Saint-Léonard
Saint-Martin (VS)
Saint-Maurice
Salgesch
Salvan
Savièse
Saxon
Sembrancher
Sierre
Simplon
Sion
St. Niklaus
Stalden (VS)
Staldenried
Steg-Hohtenn
Täsch
Termen
Törbel
Trient
Troistorrents
Turtmann-Unterems
Unterbäch
Val de Bagnes
Val-d'Illiez
Varen
Vernayaz
Vérossaz
Vétroz
Vex
Veysonnaz
Vionnaz
Visp
Visperterminen
Vouvry
Wiler (Lötschen)
Zeneggen
Zermatt
Zwischbergen

References 

Subdivisions of Valais
Valais